John Stephen Stubbs  (born 12 July 1965) is  an English competitive archer. Stubbs has competed in four Summer Paralympic Games, winning gold in the men's individual compound at the 2008 Games and silver in the  team compound open at the 2016 Games.

Achievements
Source:

References 
http://www.worldarchery.org/en-us/worldchampionships/para-bangkok2013/results.aspx 

English male archers
British male archers
Paralympic archers of Great Britain
Archers at the 2008 Summer Paralympics
Archers at the 2012 Summer Paralympics
Paralympic gold medalists for Great Britain
Paralympic silver medalists for Great Britain
Sportspeople from Manchester
1965 births
Living people
Members of the Order of the British Empire
Medalists at the 2008 Summer Paralympics
Paralympic medalists in archery